Luc Marie Daniel Ravel, C.R.S.V. (born 21 May 1957) is a French Catholic bishop. He was  appointed bishop of the Diocese of the French Armed Forces by Pope Benedict XVI on 7 October 2009. He was consecrated bishop at the Cathedral of Notre Dame de Paris on 29 November 2009. He was appointed archbishop of Strasbourg by Pope Francis on 18 February 2017.

Early life
Ravel was born in a family with origins in Martinique and Réunion on his father's side, and in the Var department of France on his mother's side. He was born the fourth child in a family of three girls and four boys.
He is a graduate of the École Polytechnique and studied to become an engineer at the IFP School. He studied Philosophy and Theology at the Abbey Saint-Pierre in the  commune of Champagne,  in the Ardèche department in southern France, and at the University of Poitiers.

Religious career
He made his solemn profession as a Canon Regular of St. Victor
on 7 December 1985, and was ordained a priest on 25 June 1988.

He was afterwards prior at the Church of Saint-Charles at Porrentruy, in Jura, Switzerland, at Montbron, and at the Tardoire and Bandiat  deanery, in Charente. He subsequently returned to the Abbey of Saint-Pierre in   the town of Champagne, where he was  master of novices from 1996 to 2007, and subprior from 2003. He founded  Notre-Dame de l`Écoute, a movement for single and celibate people.

He was appointed  Bishop of the Diocese of the French Armed Forces by Pope Benedict XVI on 7 October 2009. His consecration as a bishop took place in   Notre Dame Cathedral in Paris on  29 November 2009, presided over by cardinal André Vingt-Trois. He was elected a member of the Doctrinal Commission of the Bishops' Conference of France in 2011.

Ravel created controversy when he called abortion a "weapon of mass destruction" and called for the return of the abortion debate in French society in  the Armed Forces monthly magazine in February 2015. As a result, the French Defence Minister asked the Diocese's magazine to stop displaying the Army's logo on the cover so as to distancing the Army from its content.

Ravel was appointed Archbishop of Strasbourg, on 18 February 2017.

Notes

References

External links
Luc Ravel at the Bishops' Conference of France Website (French)

1957 births
Living people
21st-century Roman Catholic archbishops in France
Clergy from Paris
Archbishops of Strasbourg
École Polytechnique alumni